Resound or ReSound may refer to:

Resound (album), 2002 album by Ugress
"Resound", 2001 track by Neurosis from A Sun That Never Sets
CSO Resound, record label by the Chicago Symphony Orchestra

See also 
 Re:sound, audio programs affiliated with Third Coast International Audio Festival
 Resonance, acoustic phenomenon